The 2021 Washington Open (called the Citi Open for sponsorship reasons) was a tennis tournament played on outdoor hard courts. It was the 52nd edition of the Washington Open. The event was part of the ATP Tour 500 series of the 2021 ATP Tour and part of the US Open Series leading up to the US Open grand slam in September. The Washington Open took place at the William H.G. FitzGerald Tennis Center in Washington, D.C., United States, from July 31 to August 8, 2021.

Champions

Singles

  Jannik Sinner def.  Mackenzie McDonald 7–5, 4–6, 7–5

Doubles

  Raven Klaasen /  Ben McLachlan def.  Neal Skupski /  Michael Venus 7–6(7–4), 6–4.

Points and prize money

Points distribution

Prize money 

*per team

Singles main-draw entrants

Seeds

1 Rankings are as of July 26, 2021

Other entrants
The following players received wild cards into the singles main draw:
  Jenson Brooksby
  Feliciano López
  Rafael Nadal
  Brandon Nakashima
  Jack Sock

The following players received entry from the singles qualifying draw:
  Emilio Gómez
  Prajnesh Gunneswaran
  Mitchell Krueger
  Illya Marchenko
  Ramkumar Ramanathan
  Elias Ymer

Withdrawals
Before the tournament
  Hubert Hurkacz → replaced by  Emil Ruusuvuori
  John Isner → replaced by  Andreas Seppi
  Aslan Karatsev → replaced by  Daniel Elahi Galán
  Karen Khachanov → replaced by  Mackenzie McDonald
  Dominik Koepfer → replaced by  Ilya Ivashka
  Kwon Soon-woo → replaced by  James Duckworth
  Jaume Munar → replaced by  Kevin Anderson
  Guido Pella → replaced by  Steve Johnson
  Albert Ramos Viñolas → replaced by  Jordan Thompson
  Milos Raonic → replaced by  Ričardas Berankis
  Denis Shapovalov → replaced by  Egor Gerasimov

Doubles main-draw entrants

Seeds

1 Rankings are as of July 26, 2021

Other entrants
The following pairs received wildcards into the doubles main draw:
  Nick Kyrgios /  Frances Tiafoe 
  Sam Querrey /  Jack Sock

The following pair received entry from the doubles qualifying draw:
  Benoît Paire /  Jackson Withrow

Withdrawals
Before the tournament
  Juan Sebastián Cabal /  Robert Farah → replaced by  Fabrice Martin /  Max Purcell
  Wesley Koolhof /  Jean-Julien Rojer → replaced by  Grigor Dimitrov /  Tommy Paul
  Łukasz Kubot /  Marcelo Melo → replaced by  Marcus Daniell /  Marcelo Melo
  Nikola Mektić /  Mate Pavić → replaced by  Marcelo Arévalo /  Matwé Middelkoop
  Jamie Murray /  Bruno Soares → replaced by  Sebastian Korda /  Jannik Sinner
  Rajeev Ram /  Joe Salisbury → replaced by  Alexander Bublik /  Andrey Golubev

Women's invitational
Between 2011 and 2019, the Citi Open hosted conjoining men and women tournaments. However, amid the COVID-19 pandemic in 2020, the Women's Tennis Association (WTA) revoked its sanction of the Citi Open for the year's tour and added two events to its provisional calendar instead: the Top Seed Open in Lexington, Kentucky and the Prague Open. After the Citi Open returned in 2021 from the event's eventual cancellation in the prior year, the WTA stayed its revocation of the event's sanction, so the women's tournament did not return as many women's players had scheduling conflicts with the 2020 Summer Olympics. In its place, event officials created the inaugural women's invitational as a three-day exhibition during the US Open Series. Coco Gauff, Jessica Pegula, and Jennifer Brady were the three original headliners, though Brady was later replaced by Victoria Azarenka.

The players played in a round-robin format; the winner of each pair in their first matches would then play each other in the final match. The games were played in a best-of-three set format with regular scoring and a 10-point "super tiebreak" to decide the third set. The player with the best record would be crowned the champion and in the case of a tie, the winner would be decided by the player who won the most sets or games. Because the tournament was not sanctioned by the WTA, the players would not accrue or lose any points. The prize money for the inaugural champion was set at $25,000. On August 5, Gauff defeated Azarenka in the first match, 6–3, 6–1. Azarenka was scheduled to play Pegula the following day, after Brady withdrew from the tournament, to decide the final match, but Azarenka herself later withdrew from the invitational after suffering an ankle injury. On August 7, Pegula defeated Gauff in the final match, 4–6, 7–5, [10-8], to win the invitational.

References

External links
Official website

Washington Open (tennis)
Citi
2021 in sports in Washington, D.C.
Citi Open
Citi Open